Asta Gedraitite (married name Stankene) is a female former Soviet Union international table tennis player.

Table tennis career
She won a silver medal at the 1973 World Table Tennis Championships in the mixed doubles with Anatoli Strokatov.

See also
 List of table tennis players
 List of World Table Tennis Championships medalists

References

Soviet table tennis players
Living people
World Table Tennis Championships medalists
Year of birth missing (living people)